Owen Bradford Morse (February 3, 1882 – March 19, 1965) was a Canadian politician. He served in the Legislative Assembly of New Brunswick as member of the Liberal party from 1944 to 1952.

References

1882 births
1965 deaths
New Brunswick Liberal Association MLAs